The Manitou Springs Incline, also known as the Manitou Incline or simply the Incline, is a popular hiking trail rising above Manitou Springs, Colorado, near Colorado Springs. The Incline ascends on the east slope of Rocky Mountain which is itself on the eastern flank of Pikes Peak. The trail is the remains of a former  narrow gauge funicular railway whose tracks washed out during a rock slide in 1990.  The Incline is famous for its sweeping views and steep grade, with an average grade of 45% (24°) and as steep as 68% (34°) in places, making it a fitness challenge for locals of the Colorado Springs area.  The incline gains  of elevation in  horizontal. Currently the Incline has approximately 2,744 steps from the bottom to the summit, although the top step is numbered "2768". The number of steps changes occasionally with trail maintenance and deterioration.

Reservations are still currently required to hike the Manitou Incline which can be made at the Manitou Incline page on the City of Colorado Springs website.

History
The Incline was constructed under the ownership of Dr. Newton N. Brumback as a funicular in 1907, for the purpose of providing access to water tanks at the top of the mountain that would provide gravity-fed water pressure to the cities of Manitou Springs and Colorado Springs.  Originally, the railroad was constructed to access a hydroelectric plant and service the water pipes. Shortly after its construction, the Manitou and Pike's Peak Railway was opened as a tourist attraction.

The Incline's original summit house was a rudimentary building constructed from left-over materials from the Incline's construction. It burned down in 1914.  The summit house was quickly rebuilt into a more elaborate, comfortable, and safer structure, offering shelter from storms and the elements.  The 1914 structure remained until 1958 when it was replaced by an updated summit house, which remained until it was dismantled after the Incline's closure.  The Incline operated under the Pikes Peak Cog Railway until a rock slide in 1990 washed out the rail bed and the Cog Railway decided to not repair the tracks.

During the COVID-19 pandemic, the Manitou Springs City Council, under emergency declaration, voted to close the Incline on March 17, 2020. The closure was a result of health concerns over a lack of social distancing and other health measures, as well as a way to mitigate the number of incidents on the Incline that the fire department would have to address. Manitou Springs stated in a press release on March 18, 2020, "the first responders who address emergencies on the Incline are put into a high risk situation." The Mayor of Manitou Springs, John Graham, stated: "While we were reluctant to close the Incline, we had far more grave reservations regarding public health." On August 4, 2020, the Manitou Springs City Council approved a memorandum of understanding (MOU) between Colorado Springs and Manitou Springs to reopen the Incline. Within this MOU was protocol for a free online reservation system that managed the number of users, with all reservations being handled by the City of Colorado Springs.

Legal battles
Though the Incline is a popular hike and fitness destination for locals, its existence since its public closing in 1990 has been controversial.  Many locals and some National Forest Service officials wanted to keep it closed to allow it to revegetate, either by reseeding or allowing nature to reclaim the scar.

Another controversy centered on parking rights at the base of the trail head, which is co-located with the Barr Trail trailhead and the Pikes Peak Cog Railway.  All three sit in the narrow Ruxton Canyon, and the popularity of the Incline has caused major parking conflicts with these entities.  The land through which the Incline passes on its ascent is owned by three entities: the bottom portion is owned by the City of Colorado Springs, the middle section is owned by the Pikes Peak Cog Railway, and the top portion is owned by the US Forest Service.  The controversial land swap known as "Strawberry Fields" between Colorado Springs and the Broadmoor traded 14 sections of land totalling 371 acres for 189.5 acres of Colorado Springs land. The part of the Incline of owned by the Cog Railway was included in this land swap making all of the Incline now publicly owned land. The Strawberry Fields land swap was approved but was challenged in court by a  citizens group.

The legal battles over the conversion of the Incline to a public hiking trail were finally resolved in January 2013, after the issue was settled by the United States Congress.

Hiking trail and fitness challenge
Since its closure as a railway in 1990, the trail has steadily grown in popularity as a hiking trail and fitness challenge. Hiking the trail should not be undertaken by the physically unfit, as there is no vehicle access to the trail and anyone injured or suffering a medical emergency will have to walk or be carried down by other hikers. At the top of the Incline, there is a tie-in to the Barr Trail that allows for hikers to descend without going back down the Incline. Due to the close proximity to the large and active population center of Colorado Springs, the large military population of nearby Army and Air Force bases, and the US Olympic Training Center, the Incline has become a popular fitness destination for those seeking an intense workout.

About  of the way up, a Barr Trail switchback passes just a few yards from the Incline, and there is a pathway that allows those who wish to exit the Incline the opportunity to take the Barr Trail back down as a 'bailout'. In 2020 two new bailouts were added that exit to the right (north) and lead to the Ute Pass trail. The first, the Lower Ute connector, is at step #395 and the second, the Upper Ute connector, is at step #1300 which is about 500 steps below the Barr trail bailout. These two new bailouts give hikers the option to exit a very difficult trail and also serve the purpose of alleviating some of the heavy traffic on the lower Barr Trail. The Incline is at its steepest grade just after the Barr Trail bailout for about another , when it reaches the 'false summit', a semi-crest in the trail that obscures the true summit to hikers due to its extreme grade.

Records 
The verifiable satellite-tracked record was set September 25, 2015, of 17:45 by US mountain running team member Joseph Gray. Also notable is the time of twelve-time champion of the Pikes Peak Marathon Matt Carpenter (18:31).  The female Incline record is attributed to Allie McLaughlin of Colorado Springs (20:07).

In 2012, local resident Ed Baxter, 58, became the first person to complete the "Inclinathon", 13 consecutive trips up and down the Incline in one day. Baxter completed the effort in  just over 13 hours.  In 2012, Brandon Stapanowich broke the speed record for an Inclinathon at 11 hours 46 minutes.  In 2014, Stapanowich also completed the first ever Ultra-Inclinathon, completing 22 laps of the Incline in 24 hours, the most ever completed in a day.  He gained  of altitude in this endeavor.  On May 16, 2015, Wade Gardner broke the speed record for the Inclinathon with a time of 10 hours, 34 mins.

In 2011, Greg Cummings (a local resident with Type-I Diabetes) became the first person to hike the Incline more than 500 times in one year. Cummings hiked the Incline 601 times and ascended Pikes Peak 34 times, setting the World Record for elevation climbed in one year at just under . In 2013, Roger Austin ascended the Incline 719 times and reset the World Record to roughly  hiked/climbed in one year. In 2014, Greg Cummings ascended the Incline 1,400 times in 330 consecutive days, before the Incline closed for repairs. Along with other ascents, Cummings reset the World Record to  climbed in a year. Along the way, Austin set the record for most Inclinathons in one year at 26. On January 11, 2020, at the age of 62, Greg Cummings retook the one year Incline ascent record by completing 1,825 ascents in the previous 365 days and reset the World Record to 3.6 million vertical feet (1,100,000 metres) climbed in one year.

In 2022, Rachel Jones of Colorado became the first woman to climb the Incline 1,000 times in a year.

Images

References

External links
Manitou Incline Website with trail description and history
Facebook page
"Inclined", documentary by Dean Leslie, 2019

Rail trails in Colorado
Manitou Springs, Colorado
3 ft gauge railways in the United States